In Stereo is the debut studio album by hip hop group Bomfunk MC's, released in 1999 through Sony Music Finland. The album reached No. 1 on that year's Finnish albums chart and remained on that chart for 69 weeks. "Freestyler" was released as a single and became a chart-topping hit worldwide during the first half of 2000, reaching No. 1 in eleven countries.

In the group's native Finland, the album resulted in Emma awards for best new band, best debut album, best song ("Freestyler"), and best producer (JS16). In Stereo was certified Double Platinum in 1999, with 134,610 copies sold; it is currently the 25th best-selling album of all time in Finland.

Track listing

Personnel
B.O.W. – vocals, arrangement
Kärtsy Hatakka – vocals (track 6)
Mr. B – vocals (track 8)
Rummy Nanji – vocals (track 8)
J.A.K. – vocals (track 9)
DJ Gismo – turntables, arrangement
JS16 – production

Release history

Charts

Weekly charts

Year-end charts

Certifications and sales

References

See also
List of best-selling albums in Finland

Bomfunk MC's albums
1999 debut albums
Sony Music Finland albums